Luca Tranchino is an Italian Production Designer and Art Director. 
He has been training, as an Art Director, working with some of the most prominent and acclaimed Production Designers (such as Dante Ferretti, Laurence Bennett, Wolf Croeger, etc.) and Directors (such as Martin Scorsese, Woody Allen, Anthony Minghella, Lasse Hallstrom, etc.). His film credits, as Production Designer, include movies such as The Legend of Hercules (2014), Unfinished Business (2015), The Ottoman Lieutenant (2017)., The Doorman (2020).   As Art Director, he has worked on films such as Gangs of New York (2002), Cold Mountain (2003), The Aviator (2004), Casanova (2005), Hugo (2011), To Rome with Love (2012), Seventh Son (2015). In 2011 he has won The ADG Excellence in Production Design Award for a Period Feature Film, for Hugo. In 2016 he has designed Sets for the television drama Prison Break and in 2020 for the Historical TV Series Domina for Sky Atlantic. He is presently working on the Netflix TV Series "The Decameron"

Filmography 
 
 2022-2023 The Decameron (TV series) - Prod. Designer 
 2022 Domina (TV series), Season 2 - Prod. Designer
 2021 Domina (TV series), Season 1 - Prod. Designer  
 2020 The Doorman  -  Prod. Designer
 2017 Prison Break  (TV series), Season 5  - Prod. Designer   
 2017 The Ottoman Lieutenant - Prod. Designer
 2015 Unfinished Business - Prod. Designer
 2014 The Legend of Hercules - Prod. Designer
 2014 Seventh Son - Art Director 
 2013 Prisoners of the Sun - Prod. Designer 
 2013 Third Person - Art Director Supervisor  
 2012 To Rome with Love - Art Director	 
 2011 Hugo (Academy Award Winner, ADG Award Winner, BAFTA Award Winner) - Art Director 
 2010 Prince of Persia:The Sands of Time - Art Director      	
 2009 The International - Art Director 
 2007 The Hills Have Eyes 2 - Set Decorator  
 2006 The Ten Commandments (TV Mini Series) - Set Decorator 
 2005 Casanova - Art Director
 2004 The Aviator (Academy Award Winner, ADG Award Nomination, BAFTA Award Winner) - Art Director 
 2003 Cold Mountain (BAFTA Award Nomination) - Art Director 
 2002 Gangs of New York (Academy Award Nomination, ADG Award Nomination, BAFTA Award Nomination) - Art Director
 1999 Harem Suare - Set Designer 
 1999 Titus - Draftsman 
 1999 The Seventh Scroll (TV Mini Series) - Assistant Art Director 
 1996 Giamaica - Set Designer 
 1995 Cronache del terzo millennio - Set Designer  
 2004 Theatral Opera “Werther”  - Set Designer, Bologna Theater 
 2001 Theatral Opera “Orfeo”  - Set Designer, Opera Zurich 
 1996 Theatral Opera “Macbeth” - Set Designer, Opera Montecarlo

References

External links

Italian art directors
Italian production designers